Statistics of Latvian Higher League in the 1950 season.

Overview
It was contested by 17 teams, and AVN won the championship.

League standings

References
RSSSF

Latvian SSR Higher League
Football 
Latvia